KT is a 2002 Japanese-South Korean film directed by Junji Sakamoto with a screenplay by Haruhiko Arai. It is based on the kidnapping of Kim Dae-jung by agents of Park Chung-hee in August 1973 while on a trip to Tokyo. He was released in Seoul after five days.

The title KT means Killing the Target.

Plot
The story is centered on Masuo Tomita, a Japanese intelligence officer who helped arrange for South Korean agents to kidnap and try to kill Park Chung-hee's enemy Kim Dae-jung, who was in exile in Tokyo. Tomita went along with the plan to save a South Korean teacher Lee Jeong-mi, whom he loved.

Cast
 Kōichi Satō ... Masuo Tomita
 Kim Kap-soo ... Kim Chang-won
 Choi Il-hwa ... Kim Dae-jung
 Yoshio Harada ... Akikazu Kamikawa
 Michitaka Tsutsui ... Kim Kap-soo
 Yang Eun-yong ... Lee Jeong-mi
 Kim Byung-se ... Kim Jung-won
 Teruyuki Kagawa ...Haruo Satake
 Akira Emoto ... Hiroshi Uchiyama
 Kyoko Enami ... Kab-Soos Mother
 Noboru Hamada ... Minister
 Masahiro Komoto
 Akaji Maro ... Susumu Kawahara
 Ken Mitsuishi ...Yu Chun-seong
 Ryūshi Mizukami
 Nana Nakamoto ... Toshiko Takashima
 Hirochi Oguchi ... Shoichi Tsukada
 Gō Rijū ... Hong Seong-jin
 Kenji Sahara... Minister
 Ken Utsui
 Hōka Kinoshita
 Akira Hamada

References

External links
 
 

South Korean crime films
Japanese crime films
2002 films
2000s crime films
Films with screenplays by Haruhiko Arai
2000s Japanese films
2000s South Korean films